Andray Maurice Blatche (born August 22, 1986) is an American-Filipino former professional basketball player. He played nine seasons in the National Basketball Association (NBA) between 2005 and 2014 before finishing his career with five seasons in the Chinese Basketball Association (CBA). He played high school basketball at Henninger High School and South Kent School before he was drafted in the second round of the 2005 NBA draft by the Washington Wizards.

Born in New York and an American by birth, Blatche became a naturalized citizen of the Philippines in June 2014, enabling him to join the country's national basketball team.

High school career
Blatche spent four years at Henninger High School in Syracuse, New York and then an extra year at the South Kent School in South Kent, Connecticut. He averaged 27.5 points, 16.0 rebounds and 6.0 blocks per game during his fifth-year campaign in 2004–05 as he guided South Kent to a 32–9 record.

Considered a five-star recruit by Rivals.com, Blatche was listed as the No. 2 power forward and the No. 4 player in the nation in 2005.

He declared for the 2005 NBA draft out of high school, and while originally thought of as a first-round prospect, he slipped to the second round and was taken by the Washington Wizards with the 49th overall pick.

Professional career

Washington Wizards (2005–2012)
Blatche was shot in a carjacking on September 25, 2005, and as a result missed training camp.  He recovered successfully and played his first game with Washington versus Seattle on November 11, 2005, scoring five points in a 137–96 Wizards victory. On December 14, 2005, he was assigned to the Roanoke Dazzle of the NBA Development League. On January 2, 2006, he was recalled by the Wizards. He finished the 2005–06 season only playing in 29 games for the Wizards, averaging 2.3 points and 1.3 rebounds.

With the injuries to Wizards' centers Etan Thomas and Michael Ruffin, Blatche was occasionally pressed into service as a backup center in the 2006–07 season. On August 17, 2007, Blatche re-signed with the Wizards to a multi-year deal. During the 2007–08 season, Blatche continued showing improvement, and with center Etan Thomas out with a season-ending heart condition, his minutes increased. At the end of the season, Blatche played in every game for the Wizards, starting 15, averaging 8.2 points, 5.2 rebounds and 1.4 blocks.

On January 9, 2010, Blatche was fined $10,000 by the Wizards for participating in Gilbert Arenas' mimicking gunplay before a game on January 5, 2010 against the Philadelphia 76ers.  Arenas was being investigated for a prior incident involving guns in the Wizards' locker room, but made light of the accusations by pointing his finger at his teammates, as if he were shooting them. His teammates were photographed smiling and laughing with him.

On February 28, 2010, he scored a career high 36 points on 17–31 shooting during the Wizards' 89–85 victory against the New Jersey Nets. Blatche continued to be the starter on the team, and his stats significantly improved. Blatche just missed a triple-double as he had 20 points, a career-high 13 assists, nine rebounds and two steals in the Wizards' 109–99 victory over the New Jersey Nets on April 4. In September 2010, he signed a veteran extension with the Wizards. The 2010–11 NBA season was a career year for Blatche, with 63 starts in 64 games played, and career highs in points (16.8), rebounds (8.2), assists (2.3) and steals (1.5).

On March 20, 2012, the Wizards announced that they were benching Blatche indefinitely due to lack of conditioning, and on July 16, he was waived via the amnesty clause. Blatche would later be vocal about his treatment by the Wizards organization, stating, "When things weren't starting well, they used me as an excuse." He also claimed that the management deliberately tried to ruin his career: "For them to say, ‘Oh, he's a bad teammate. He's a cancer in the locker room.’ He's this and that. All that was a bunch of lies! A bunch of lies. That's what really made me mad. That showed me, they tried to end me." Coach Randy Wittman responded to the allegations by saying, "I’m not going to get into that. We did everything we could to help him, as we will with every player that ever comes here."

Brooklyn Nets (2012–2014)

On September 12, 2012, Blatche signed with the Brooklyn Nets. After Blatche signed with the Nets, he decided to wear number 0. "Zero reminds of me how everybody gave up on me", he said. When Brook Lopez injured his foot, Blatche was given the chance to start in his absence. Without Lopez, the Nets struggled with a 2–5 record. Despite the Nets' struggles without Lopez, Blatche played well, averaging 18.1 points and 8.8 rebounds. On January 4, 2013, Blatche made his return to the Verizon Center and was playing the Washington Wizards. When Blatche entered that game in the first quarter, he was booed heartily by the fans in attendance. In 19 minutes of game action, Blatche had 13 points and 12 rebounds.

Blatche played in all 82 regular season games in 2012–13, averaging 10.3 points and 5.1 rebounds and set a career high in field goal percentage (51.2%). Blatche also played in seven playoff games for the Nets and averaged 10.3 points and 4.9 rebounds.

On July 11, 2013, Blatche re-signed with the Nets. In December 2013, starting center Brook Lopez went down with a season-ending foot injury, increasing Blatche's minutes. In the first game without Lopez, Blatche had 11 points and seven rebounds in 25 minutes of action in a loss to the Indiana Pacers.

On June 20, 2014, Blatche opted out of his contract with the Nets, thus becoming an unrestricted free agent.

Xinjiang Flying Tigers (2014–2018)
On September 20, 2014, Blatche signed a one-year, $2.5 million contract with the Xinjiang Flying Tigers of the Chinese Basketball Association. Following the conclusion of the 2014–15 CBA regular season, Blatche terminated his contract with Xinjiang on February 1, 2015. In 38 games, he averaged 31.1 points, 14.6 rebounds, 5.1 assists and 2.8 steals per game.

In March 2015, Blatche re-signed with Xinjiang on a three-year, $7.5 million contract.

In November 2016, Blatche sustained an injury and was subsequently replaced on the roster temporarily by Ben Bentil. He returned to action in late December and went on to lead Xinjiang to the CBA Finals, where they swept the series against the Guangdong Southern Tigers 4–0 to claim the championship.

On January 4, 2018, it was announced that Augusto Lima was taking Blatche's spot on the roster. Blatche was criticized for his poor performance and negative attitude during the early stages of the 2017–18 season. He averaged 12.8 points and 6.4 rebounds in the five games he played, and had a negative impact on the team's defensive efforts. He returned to the team in March 2018 for their playoff series against Guangdong.

Tianjin Gold Lions (2018–2019)
In December 2018, Blatche signed with the Tianjin Gold Lions of the Chinese Basketball Association. In 19 games, he averaged 20.7 points, 11.0 rebounds, 4.1 assists, 1.7 steals and 1.8 blocks per game.

Career statistics

NBA

Regular season

|-
| align="left" | 
| align="left" | Washington
| 29 || 0 || 6.0 || .388 || .231 || .833 || 1.3 || .3 || .2 || .2 || 2.2
|-
| align="left" | 
| align="left" | Washington
| 56 || 13 || 12.2 || .437 || .148 || .612 || 3.4 || .7 || .3 || .6 || 3.7
|-
| align="left" | 
| align="left" | Washington
| 82 || 15 || 20.4 || .474 || .231 || .695 || 5.2 || 1.1 || .6 || 1.4 || 7.5
|-
| align="left" | 
| align="left" | Washington
| 71 || 36 || 24.0 || .471 || .238 || .704 || 5.3 || 1.7 || .7 || 1.0 || 10.0
|-
| align="left" | 
| align="left" | Washington
| 81 || 36 || 27.9 || .478 || .295 || .744 || 6.3 || 2.1 || 1.0 || .9 || 14.1
|-
| align="left" | 
| align="left" | Washington
| 64 || 63 || 33.9 || .445 || .222 || .777 || 8.2 || 2.3 || 1.5 || .8 || 16.8
|-
| align="left" | 
| align="left" | Washington
| 26 || 13 || 24.1 || .380 || .286 || .673 || 5.8 || 1.1 || .8 || .7 || 8.5
|-
| align="left" | 
| align="left" | Brooklyn
| 82 || 8 || 19.0 || .512 || .136 || .685 || 5.1 || 1.0 || 1.0 || .7 || 10.3 
|-
| align="left" | 
| align="left" | Brooklyn
| 73 || 7 || 22.2 || .476 || .278 || .742 || 5.3 || 1.5 || 1.0 || .5 || 11.2
|-
| style="text-align:center;" colspan="2"|Career
| 564 || 191 || 22.1 || .467 || .237 || .725 || 5.4 || 1.4 || .9 || .8 || 10.1

Playoffs

|-
| align="left" | 2007
| align="left" | Washington
| 2 || 0 || 12.5 || .667 || .000 || 1.000 || 3.5 || .0 || .0 || .0 || 4.5
|-
| align="left" | 2008
| align="left" | Washington
| 6 || 0 || 14.8 || .429 || .000 || .333 || 3.3 || .2 || .3 || 1.0 || 3.7
|-
| align="left" | 2013
| align="left" | Brooklyn
| 7 || 0 || 19.7 || .500 || .000 || .824 || 4.9 || 1.3 || .3 || .4 || 10.3
|-
| align="left" | 2014
| align="left" | Brooklyn
| 12 || 0 || 14.3 || .448 || .000 || .833 || 5.0 || .3 || .5 || .2 || 6.4
|-
| style="text-align:center;" colspan="2"|Career
| 27 || 0 || 15.7 || .476 || .000 || .733 || 4.5 || .5 || .4 || .4 || 6.7

CBA

National team career

In January 2014, Blatche was asked by the Gilas Pilipinas to take part as a naturalized player for the 2014 FIBA Basketball World Cup in Spain and the 2014 Asian Games in Incheon, South Korea. On May 26, 2014, a bill granting Blatche's Filipino citizenship was approved by the Philippine Senate. On June 11, 2014, Blatche officially became a Filipino citizen upon the signing of Republic Act 10636 by Philippine President Benigno Aquino III.

In August 2014, Blatche was named in the 2014 Philippine FIBA Basketball World Cup and Asian Games squad. He was later disqualified to play in the 2014 Asian Games due to eligibility issues cited by the Olympic Council of Asia (OCA), as he lacked the required three-year residency in the Philippines. In five games at the World Cup, he averaged 21.2 points, 13.8 rebounds and 1.6 steals per game. With an 18-point, 14-rebound performance, Blatche helped the Philippines to their first World Cup win in 40 years, defeating Senegal 81–79 in overtime.

In 2015, Blatche played for the Philippines at the 2015 FIBA Asia Championship under new head coach Tab Baldwin. In nine games, he averaged 17.8 points, 9.2 rebounds and 1.2 assists per game. The following year, the team competed in the FIBA Olympic Qualifying Tournament, where in two games, he scored a total of 51 points.

Blatche was expected to suit up for the 2017 FIBA Asia Cup but pulled out due to security concerns over the militant situation in the host country Lebanon. He was replaced by Christian Standhardinger as the Philippine team's naturalized citizen.

On July 2, 2018, Blatche was involved in a brawl during the Philippines' 2019 FIBA World Cup qualifier against Australia.

Personal life
On the Sunday morning of September 25, 2005, three months after the Wizards selected him with the 49th overall pick in the NBA draft, Blatche was shot in an attempted carjacking that took place near his home in Alexandria, Virginia. Police said Blatche was ordered out of the car by men who emerged from a van and was shot before he could fully exit. Blatche's mother, Angela Oliver, said he was shot once in the chest, but that the bullet did not hit any vital organs. He was released from hospital two days later. As a result of his injuries, he missed the Wizards' training camp, although he could walk on his own three days after the shooting and one day after being released from the hospital.

On August 2, 2007, Blatche was charged with sexual solicitation in the Logan Circle neighborhood of Washington, D.C. after allegedly soliciting sex from an undercover police officer. The solicitation charge was dropped after Blatche followed court orders and attended a day-long seminar for men who solicit prostitutes.

Blatche was arrested on June 4, 2008, in Virginia on charges of reckless driving and driving on a suspended license for the third time. Blatche was going 86 mph in a 70 mph zone in a Mercedes on Interstate 85. He was released on bond.

In June 2011, Blatche established the Andray Blatche Foundation and went on a charity mission to Jamaica where he donated sneakers, basketballs and gave a $50,000 check to Jamaican schools.

References

External links

FIBA player profile

1986 births
Living people
African-American basketball players
American men's basketball players
American emigrants to the Philippines
American shooting survivors
Basketball players from Syracuse, New York
Basketball players from Virginia
Brooklyn Nets players
Centers (basketball)
Filipino people of African-American descent
Naturalized citizens of the Philippines
National Basketball Association high school draftees
Philippines men's national basketball team players
Filipino men's basketball players
Power forwards (basketball)
Roanoke Dazzle players
South Kent School alumni
Sportspeople from Alexandria, Virginia
Tianjin Pioneers players
Washington Wizards draft picks
Washington Wizards players
Xinjiang Flying Tigers players
2014 FIBA Basketball World Cup players
2019 FIBA Basketball World Cup players
21st-century African-American sportspeople
20th-century African-American people